Rai Valley is a rural settlement in Marlborough, New Zealand. The Rai River runs past the locality to join the Pelorus River at the locality of Pelorus Bridge to the south. At the 2018 census, the settlement had a population of 177.

The area may have been named for the Rangitāne chief, Rai kau moana.

The locality supports dairy farming in the area, with a dairy and cheese factory established in about 1909.

History
The Valley was one of the last areas explored by Europeans in northern Marlborough. John Tinline discovered it while looking for a route to Nelson in January 1850.

The Rai Valley was densely forested in the 19th century. A township grew up at Carluke, just to the west of Rai Valley locality, around a sawmill built by William Brownlee in 1907. About 100 people worked at the mill, and a light railway connected it to a port on the Pelorus River.

Returned servicemen took up many local farms in 1919.

Demographics

Rai Valley had a population of 177 at the 2018 New Zealand census, an increase of 30 people (20.4%) since the 2013 census, and an increase of 36 people (25.5%) since the 2006 census. There were 81 households. There were 84 males and 96 females, giving a sex ratio of 0.88 males per female. The median age was 40.8 years (compared with 37.4 years nationally), with 45 people (25.4%) aged under 15 years, 21 (11.9%) aged 15 to 29, 75 (42.4%) aged 30 to 64, and 33 (18.6%) aged 65 or older.

Ethnicities were 93.2% European/Pākehā, 20.3% Māori, 3.4% Pacific peoples, 0.0% Asian, and 1.7% other ethnicities (totals add to more than 100% since people could identify with multiple ethnicities).

Although some people objected to giving their religion, 67.8% had no religion, 20.3% were Christian and 1.7% had other religions.

Of those at least 15 years old, 12 (9.1%) people had a bachelor or higher degree, and 42 (31.8%) people had no formal qualifications. The median income was $28,600, compared with $31,800 nationally. The employment status of those at least 15 was that 60 (45.5%) people were employed full-time, 21 (15.9%) were part-time, and 3 (2.3%) were unemployed.

Education
Rai Valley Area School is a coeducational composite (years 1–13) school with a decile rating of 6 and a roll of 94.

Notes

References

External links

 Rai Valley Area School website

Populated places in the Marlborough Region